The Dark Legacy is a full-length studio album by German heavy metal band Paragon, released in 2003.

Track listing
 "The Legacy" - 5:03
 "Mirror of Fate" - 5:16
 "Breaking Glass" - 5:38
 "Black Hole" - 3:11
 "Eye of The Storm" - 5:04
 "Maze of Dread" - 4:25
 "The Afterlife" - 5:22
 "Green Hell" - 4:13
 "Back from Hell" - 3:33
 "Into The Black" (Digi-Pak version only)
 "Metal Invaders" - 4:05

Credits 
 Andreas Babuschkin - Lead Vocals
 Martin Christian - Guitars / Backing vocals
 Claudius Cremer - Guitars
 Jan Bünning - Bass / Backing vocals
 Markus Corby - Drums

All songs written and arranged by: Christian / Bünning / Corby / Babuschkin, 
except "Into The Black" by: Martin Christian and "Metal Invaders" by: Kai Hansen

Paragon (band) albums
2003 albums